is a Japanese mathematical physicist, best known for his invention with Ryogo Kubo of the Hierarchical equations of motion. In 1993, while working at University of Rochester with Shaul Mukamel, he published a theoretical paper laying the foundation for (optical) two-dimensional femtosecond spectroscopies.

See also
 Hierarchical equations of motion

References

Japanese physicists
Academic staff of Kyoto University
Keio University alumni
Living people
1960 births
Fellows of the American Physical Society